Comics Unleashed is a half-hour comedic talk show produced by the Entertainment Studios production company (formerly CF Entertainment) and hosted by Byron Allen, with John Cramer as announcer and DJ Cobra or sometimes DJ A1 providing music support.

Format
Each episode begins with Allen delivering a short, usually topical monologue, after which he introduces the night's DJ and the panel of four comedians. Allen sets each comedian up with a prescribed, usually generic premise, at which point the comedian delivers a monologue from their stand-up routine. The monologues by different comedians seldom tie into each other, but the structure of the show puts the monologues in the loose framework of a panel discussion talk show.

Several episodes of the series featured an all-black cast, in which case the show was branded as Comics Unleashed: Hot Chocolate. This branding was later edited out.

Broadcast history
First-run weekly episodes were originally produced from 2006–07, with repeats still airing in some markets, generally in the very late-night to overnight hours under bulk barter arrangements made for the various series of Entertainment Studios, with some notable carriers having included CBS Television Stations (which schedules it as a lead-out for The Late Late Show on CBS owned-and-operated stations). Back-to-back episodes also aired in prime time on MyNetworkTV before it became a programming service. 

Despite having promoted "renewals" with station groups, the program did not actually produce any new episodes beyond its original 2006–07 run until 2014, to the point that copyright notices were edited out from later airings in an attempt to conceal their age (not withstanding their outdated topical humor). In 2014, new episodes of Comics Unleashed were produced for the first time since 2007.

References

External links 
 Comics Unleashed official site
 

2000s American comedy television series
2006 American television series debuts
2000s American television talk shows
English-language television shows
First-run syndicated television programs in the United States
Television series by Entertainment Studios